Brian Burke  is an Irish retired Gaelic footballer who played as a midfielder for the Tipperary senior team.

From  Fethard, Co. Tipperary.   Burke first arrived on the inter-county scene at the age of fifteen when he first linked up with the Tipperary minor team before later joining the under-21 and junior sides. Burke made his senior debut during the 1985 championship and played at inter-county level for Tipperary for 13 years.

He has won five Tipperary Senior Football Championship medals with his club, Fethard.

He represented Ireland against Australia in the 1990 International Rules Series.

He retired from inter-county football following the conclusion of the 1998 championship.

In retirement from playing Burke became involved in team management and coaching. He has served as a selector with the Tipperary minor, under-21 and senior teams.

Honours

Player

Fethard
Tipperary Senior Football Championship (5): 1984, 1988, 1993, 1997, 2001

Tipperary
McGrath Cup (2): 1989, 1993
Munster Minor Football Championship (1): 1984

References

1966 births
Living people
American Gaelic footballers
American hurlers
Dual players
Fethard Gaelic footballers
Fethard hurlers
Gaelic football selectors
Irish international rules football players
Tipperary inter-county Gaelic footballers
Tipperary inter-county hurlers